Alfred Clarke (23 August 1926 – 17 July 1971) was an English association football player and manager. He played as a centre forward for a number of Football League clubs during the 1940s and 1950s.

References

External links

English footballers
English football managers
Footballers from Oldham
Association football forwards
Stalybridge Celtic F.C. players
Crewe Alexandra F.C. players
Burnley F.C. players
Oldham Athletic A.F.C. players
Halifax Town A.F.C. players
English Football League players
1926 births
1971 deaths
People from Oldham